The Richard Ward House is a historic house in Andover, Massachusetts.  It is a -story wood-frame house, with asymmetrical massing characteristic of the Queen Anne style.  It has a front gable with decorative cut shingles and an oriel window, and a porch with turned posts and balustrade.  It is a locally distinctive example of a middle class Queen Anne style Victorian in a rural setting.  It was built between 1885 and 1888 for Richard Ward, a milk dealer who had married into the locally prominent Abbot family.
 
The house was listed on the National Register of Historic Places in 1982.

See also
National Register of Historic Places listings in Andover, Massachusetts
National Register of Historic Places listings in Essex County, Massachusetts

References

Houses in Andover, Massachusetts
National Register of Historic Places in Andover, Massachusetts
Houses on the National Register of Historic Places in Essex County, Massachusetts